Hobb's Mill, also known as Hobbs Drainage Mill, is an open trestle windpump which stands by the side of the River Bure in Horning, North Norfolk, England, and is a Grade II* listed structure.

The mill was built before 1930, probably in the late 19th century. The frame is made of wood, with four braced cant posts standing on brick piers supporting a weatherboarded cap and fantail. In the picture, the four sails are missing.

The mill was unique in that it was the only trestle mill to operate a scoop wheel. Both the mill and scoop wheel have been partly restored by the Windmill Trust.

References

Windmills of the Norfolk Broads
Smock mills in England
Grade II* listed buildings in Norfolk
Windpumps in the United Kingdom
North Norfolk
Grade II* listed windmills